Strepsilin is a chemical found in lichens. It produces an emerald green colour in the C test. It is a dibenzofuran dimer, with hydroxy, oxy and methyl side groups. It is named after Cladonia strepsilis. Strepsilin was discovered by Wilhelm Zopf in 1903. The structure of strepsilin was determined by Shoji Shibata.

Properties
Strepsilin is degraded in alkali to 1-methyl-3,7-dihydroxydibenzofuran.

Strepsilin melts at 324 °C.

Occurrence

Strepsilin is found in some Cladonia species. It is also found in Siphula and Stereocaulon azoreum.

References

Dibenzofurans
Furanones
Isobenzofurans
Phenols
Lichen products
Heterocyclic compounds with 4 rings